Rosa Luna (June 20, 1937 – June 13, 1993) was a Uruguayan dancer. She was considered to be a living legend of Uruguayan dance.

The daughter of Ceferina Luna, a poor washerwoman of African descent, she was born Amelia Luna in Montevideo. Seven of her siblings died of malnutrition. When she was nine, her stepfather sent her to work as a maid for wealthy people. She later began performing as a vedette dancer, performing candombe dance in the Uruguayan Carnival. She began performing with various groups, later establishing her own candombe group.

She participated in a radio program about the carnival and performed in theatre productions and shows in cafés. She also wrote articles for newspapers. Luna performed in various South American countries, as well as in Cuba, the Dominican Republic, Mexico, Australia, Spain, Italy, the United States and Canada.

She was married twice: her second husband was Raúl Abirad. In 1988, she published an autobiography Sin tanga y sin tongo, with Abirad as co-author.

Luna died of a heart attack at the age of 55 while performing in Canada.

In 2017, a series of performances by candombe groups and works of art inspired by Luna were presented to mark the 80th anniversary of her birth.

References 

1937 births
1993 deaths
Uruguayan female dancers
People from Montevideo
Candombe
Uruguayan vedettes
Burials at the Cementerio del Norte, Montevideo